Thomas Herbert Power (29 July 1802 – 28 November 1873) was an auctioneer, pastoral agent and politician in colonial Victoria (Australia), a member of the Victorian Legislative Council.

Power was born in Carrick-on-Suir in County Tipperary, Ireland. His parents were David Power, a merchant, and Bridget, née Higgins. Power emigrated to the Port Phillip District in 1839 via Launceston, Tasmania. He was an auctioneer in Melbourne from 1839 to 1843 and again in 1846; he was also a squatter in Boroondara in the early 1840s.

Power was elected to the Southern Province of the new Legislative Council in November 1856, a seat he held until 1 September 1864.

Power was a director of the National Bank of Australasia in 1860–1866 and a commissioner of the Savings Bank of Victoria. He died in Hawthorn, Victoria on 28 November 1873. He was married to Mary Sophia Blurton, there was at least one child, a son Robert.

References

 

1802 births
1873 deaths
Members of the Victorian Legislative Council
Irish emigrants to colonial Australia
People from County Tipperary
19th-century Australian politicians